Friederike of Hanover may refer to:

 Frederica of Mecklenburg-Strelitz (1778–1841), Queen of Hanover
 Princess Frederica of Hanover (1848–1926)
 Frederica of Hanover (1917–1981), Queen of the Hellenes